William Hervey may refer to:

William Hervey, 1st Baron Hervey (died 1642), MP for Horsham, and for Petersfield
William Hervey (politician, born 1586), MP for Preston, and for Bury St Edmunds
William Hervey (British Army officer) (1732–1815), MP for Bury St Edmunds 1763–68
William Hervy (died c. 1400), MP for Gloucestershire

See also
William Harvey (disambiguation)